The Entertainment and Sports Arena is a multi-purpose events facility, located on the St. Elizabeths East Campus, in Congress Heights, a residential neighborhood in southeast Washington, D.C.

The arena is home to the Washington Mystics of the WNBA and the Capital City Go-Go of the NBA G League.  In addition, it houses a practice facility for the Washington Wizards of the NBA.

The arena was officially opened on September 22, 2018.

Location and design
The 4,200-seat arena is mainly used for basketball; however, there are plans for the facility to also host concerts, community events and other sporting events. The location of the arena was selected due to its proximity to St. Elizabeths Hospital, distance to the greater Washington, D.C. area, location to the Congress Heights station of the Washington Metro, the confluence of the Potomac and Anacostia Rivers, and ability to improve the local community through jobs and infrastructure improvements.

History

Construction for the arena, to include razing of surrounding buildings, began on February 19, 2016. Of the $65 million estimated cost for construction, 90% of the cost will be taxpayer funded. The District of Columbia will own the facility while Events DC will operate the facility.

Members of the DC Council sought to introduce legislation capping public expenditure in the case of cost overruns. On July 28, Greg O'Dell, Chairperson of Events DC, requested an additional $10 million in funding while decreasing the number of seats in the facility. He said earlier estimates were premature. 

In 2018, O'Dell announced that the cost had increased to $68.8 million, due in part to additions like drywall, and catwalks and higher than anticipated costs like contractors. The final cost was nearly 25 percent more than estimated, which DC taxpayers were required to cover. 

Events DC boasted about the number of local business used in the construction of the facility, but could not provide a list of any of the businesses. Local businesses reported that they were unable to find work at the site.

Operations
Events DC significantly underestimated the costs of operating the facility and in 2019 the Events DC board approved more than $1 million in additional costs to cover the shortfall. A contract for a firm to find naming rights for the facility was funded at $180,000 per year.

Events
PFL 10, a mixed martial arts event was held at the arena on October 20, 2018.
Games 1, 2, and 5 of the 2019 WNBA Finals were held at the arena.
The Colonial Athletic Association men's basketball tournament.
All Elite Wrestling's television series Dynamite and Rampage on January 19 and 21, 2022.
New Japan Pro-Wrestling's pay-per-view event Capital Collision on May 14, 2022.

External links
 Official site

References

Congress Heights
Sports venues completed in 2018
2018 establishments in Washington, D.C.
Basketball venues in Washington, D.C.
Gymnastics venues in Washington, D.C.
Mixed martial arts venues in Washington, D.C.
Music venues in Washington, D.C.
Music venues completed in 2018
Capital City Go-Go
NBA G League venues
Washington Mystics venues
Washington Justice
Esports venues in Washington, D.C.